The Australian Sculling Championship (Professional) Title was first recognised in the early 1850s. George Mulhall was the first champion due to his dominance in heavy boats. From 1858 when racing was held on the Parramatta River, Richard Green became the Champion. He was later the first international contestant for the World Sculling Championship and that race was held on the Thames in 1863. Thus began a long association of Australian Champions who were either contestants in, or actual holders of, the World Title.

From 1866 William Hickey was the Champion, a position he held until being disposed by Michael Rush in 1873. In turn the title was held by Edward Trickett and Elias C. Laycock. Trickett won the World Title in 1876, and held it until 1880, and from then on any Australian holders of that title were generally considered to be the Australian Champion as well. These people were:

For the rest of the time the Title was in existence it became a more identifiable entity mostly, but not totally, separated from the World Title. The holders were:

Only the holders are listed here but there were a much greater number of contests as matches were run on the challenge system. One man would challenge the holder for the title and for money. 

As with the world Title there was less interest in the Australian Tile after the Second World War. In general, professional sculling declined in popularity and eventually the Title lapsed as scullers and the public became less interested in such races. Amateur honours such as Olympic selection were much more attractive.

References

 "Sculling and Skulduggery" by Stuart Ripley, Australia, 2009.
World rowing history - professional racing

Rowing in Australia
Rowing competitions in Australia
National championships in Australia